Marie Horáčková (born 24 December 1997) is a Czech archer. She competed in the women's individual event at the 2020 Summer Olympics.

References

External links
 

1997 births
Living people
Czech female archers
Olympic archers of the Czech Republic
Archers at the 2020 Summer Olympics
Place of birth missing (living people)